Ona de Sants-Montjuïc is a local radio station in Barcelona city, broadcasting at 94.6 FM. Its also transmits on the Internet.

The station opened as Ona Popular de Sants in 1985 at the Ateneu Popular de Sants as an activity of this cultural association.  It is a local and cultural radio station, approved by the Catalan government.

External links
Official site

Catalan-language radio stations
Radio stations in Catalonia
Radio stations established in 1985
Mass media in Barcelona
1985 establishments in Spain